The 1933 Balkan Cup was the fourth Balkan Cup football tournament. The national teams of Yugoslavia, Greece, Bulgaria and Romania took part and it was won by Romania, the host of the tournament. Remarkably, Romania didn't concede a single goal throughout the whole tournament. The top goalscorers were Gheorghe Ciolac and Ștefan Dobay (both Romania) with 4 goals each.

Final standings

Matches

Winner

Statistics

Goalscorers

References 

1931–32
1932–33 in European football
1932–33 in Romanian football
1932–33 in Bulgarian football
1932–33 in Greek football
1932–33 in Yugoslav football